This is a list of all commanders, deputy commanders, senior enlisted leaders, and chiefs of staff of the United States Indo-Pacific Command.

Current headquarters staff
  John C. Aquilino, Commander
  Stephen Sklenka, Deputy Commander
 David L. Isom, Senior Enlisted Leader
  Joshua M. Rudd, Chief of Staff
  Angenene L. Robertson, Director, Personnel (J1)
  Thomas M. Henderschedt, Director, Intelligence (J2)
  John F.G. Wade, Director, Operations (J3)
  David G. Shoemaker, Deputy Director, Operations (J3)
  Gavin J. Gardner, Director, Logistics and Engineering (J4)
  Christopher McPhillips, Director, Strategic Planning and Policy (J5)
  Jennifer Short, Deputy Director, Strategic Planning and Policy (J5)
  Mark D. Mies, Director, Command, Control, Communications and Cyber (J6)
  Michael R. Drowley, Director, Training and Exercises (J7)

List of commanders of the United States Indo-Pacific Command

List of deputy commanders of the United States Indo-Pacific Command

List of senior enlisted leaders of the United States Indo-Pacific Command

List of chiefs of staff of the United States Indo-Pacific Command

See also
 Leadership of the United States Africa Command
 Leadership of the United States European Command
 Leadership of the United States Northern Command
 Leadership of the United States Space Command
 Leadership of the United States Cyber Command
 Leadership of the United States Strategic Command
 Leadership of the United States Transportation Command

References

Lists of American military personnel